Dzmitry Viktaravich Hushchanka (born 12 May 1988) is a Belarusian professional football player currently playing for Vitebsk.

External links
 Profile from Dinamo Minsk 
 
 

1988 births
Living people
Sportspeople from Vitebsk
Belarusian footballers
Association football goalkeepers
FC Vitebsk players
FC Dinamo Minsk players
FC Belshina Bobruisk players
FC Slavia Mozyr players